Tun Abdul Malek bin Yusuf (1899 – 6 July 1977) was the Yang di-Pertua Negeri of Malacca from 1959 to 1971.

Honours

Honour of Malaya
 : 
 Grand Commander of the Order of the Defender of the Realm (SMN) – Tun (1961)
 : 
 Gold medal of the Sultan Yahya Petra Coronation Medal (1961)

References

1899 births
Malaysian people of Minangkabau descent
1977 deaths
Malaysian people of Malay descent
Malaysian Muslims
Yang di-Pertua Negeri of Malacca
Chief Ministers of Negeri Sembilan
Negeri Sembilan state executive councillors
Grand Commanders of the Order of the Defender of the Realm